A List of churches in Highland (council area), Scotland.

The area was previously divided into civil parishes, one for each medieval church:
 Caithness: Bower, Canisbay, Dunnet, Halkirk, Latheron, Olrig, Reay (partly in Sutherland until 1891), Thurso, Watten, and Wick.
 Sutherland: Assynt, Clyne, Creich, Dornoch, Durness, Eddrachillis, Farr, Golspie, Kildonan, Lairg, Lothbeg, Rogart, and Tongue.
 Inverness-shire: Abernethy and Kincardine (partly in Morayshire until 1891), Alvie, Ardersier, Arisaig and Moidart, Boleskine and Abertarff, Bracadale, Croy & Dalcross, Daviot & Dunlichity, Petty (all three partly in Nairnshire until 1891), Dores, Duirinish, Duthil & Rothiemurchus (partly in Morayshire until 1870), Glenelg, Inverness and Bona, Kilmallie, Small Isles (both partly in Argyllshire until 1891), Kilmonivaig, Kilmorack (partly in Ross and Cromarty until 1891), Kingussie & Insh, Kirkhill, Laggan, Moy & Dalarossie, Portree, Sleat, Snizort, Strath, and Urquhart & Glenmoriston.
 Ross and Cromarty: Alness, Applecross, Avoch, Contin, Cromarty, Dingwall, Edderton, Fearn, Fodderty, Gairloch, Glenshiel, Killearnan, Kintail, Knockbain, Lochalsh, Lochbroom, Lochcarron, Logie Easter, Nigg, Resolis, Rosemarkie, Rosskeen, Tain, Tarbat, Urquhart & Logie Wester (partly in Nairnshire until 1891), and Urray (partly in Inverness-shire until 1891).
 Nairnshire: Ardclach, Auldearn, Cawdor (partly in Inverness-shire until 1891) and Nairn.
 Morayshire: Cromdale, Inverallan & Advie (partly in Inverness-shire until 1891), and Edinkillie (now partially in Moray).
 Argyllshire: Ardchattan and Muckairn, Glen Orchy and Inishail, Lismore and Appin (all three now partially in Argyll & Bute), Ardgour, Ardnamurchan, and Morvern.

List of churches 

Croick Church,  Strath Carron, Sutherland

Defunct churches

References

External links
Historic churches of the Highlands at Britainexpress.com

Churches in Highland (council area)
Highland